The 1996 Fiji rugby union tour of New Zealand and South Africa were a series of matches played in June and July in New Zealand and South Africa by Fiji national rugby union team.

Results 
Scores and results list Fiji's points tally first.

References 
 

Fiji
tour
Fiji national rugby union team tours
tour
Rugby union tours of New Zealand
tour
Rugby union tours of South Africa